Vakil Qeshlaq (also Romanized as Vakīl Qeshlāq; also known as Qishlaqs, Tāzeh Qeshlāq, Vakil-Kishlaki, Vakīl Qeshlāqī, and Vakīl Qeshlāqī) is a village in Qeshlaqat-e Afshar Rural District, Afshar District, Khodabandeh County, Zanjan Province, Iran. At the 2006 census, its population was 32, in 5 families.

References 

Populated places in Khodabandeh County